Lewis Findlay Watson (April 14, 1819 – August 25, 1890) was a Republican member of the U.S. House of Representatives from Pennsylvania.

Lewis Findlay Watson was born in Crawford County, Pennsylvania. He attended the common schools and engaged in mercantile pursuits at Titusville, Pennsylvania in 1832. He moved to Warren, Pennsylvania, in 1835 and continued his former pursuits until 1837. He served as clerk in the office of the recorder in 1838.  He studied law at the Warren Academy from 1839 to 1840. He resumed his former mercantile pursuits until 1860. He was engaged as an operator in lumber and in the production of petroleum from 1860 to 1875. He organized and was the first president of the Conewango Valley Railroad Co. in 1861. He was elected president of the Warren Savings Bank at its organization in 1870.

Watson was elected as a Republican to the Forty-fifth Congress. He was again elected to the Forty-seventh Congress. Finally, he was elected to the Fifty-first Congress and served until his death in Washington, D.C., in 1890. Interment in Oakland Cemetery in Warren, Pennsylvania.

See also
List of United States Congress members who died in office (1790–1899)

Sources

The Political Graveyard

1819 births
1890 deaths
Republican Party members of the United States House of Representatives from Pennsylvania
19th-century American politicians
People from Crawford County, Pennsylvania